Jonathan Alistair James Reekie  (born 2 September 1964, in London) has been the Director of Somerset House Trust since 2014. During this time the renovation of the historic site has been completed including the launch of Somerset House Studios, helping establish Somerset House as “London’s Working Arts Centre”, home to a creative community in central London. Reekie’s overseen the expansion of the cultural programme including PJ Harvey’s Recording in Progress with Artangel, Björk Digital, Big Bang Data, Perfume, Get Up Stand Up Now. In 2019 Reekie co-curated with Sarah Cook, the exhibition 24/7, a wake up call to a non-stop world, based on the book by Jonathan Crary.

Career
Reekie's first job, when still a student, was working for the opera festival Musica nel Chiostro, Batignano, Italy. On finishing his degree Reekie spent 5 seasons at Glyndebourne Opera.
In 1991 Reekie joined the Almeida Theatre as General Manager, to work alongside the two artistic directors, Jonathan Kent and Ian McDiarmid and helped produce over 30 theatre productions. Whilst at the Almeida Reekie founded a contemporary opera festival, Almeida Opera, as a successor to the Almeida Festival, commissioning and producing over 20 contemporary operas and concert series including Thomas Adès’s Powder Her Face, Jonathan Dove, Giorgio Battistelli and UK premieres by Heiner Goebbels, Olga Neuwirth, Per Nørgård.
He became Chief Executive of Aldeburgh Music in 1997, though Reekie continued to collaborate with Almeida Opera for a further 5 years. Reekie stayed at Aldeburgh for 16 years, collaborating with Festival Artistic Directors Thomas Adès 1999-2008  and Pierre-Laurent Aimard from 2009.
He was the architect of Aldeburgh’s year-long Benjamin Britten Centenary programme in 2013, most notably Peter Grimes on Aldeburgh beach (described in The Guardian as “a remarkable, and surely unrepeatable achievement”)  and the Borough, created by Punchdrunk (theatre company).
At Aldeburgh Reekie produced over 20 new operas and music theatre works, many commissioned, including composers Richard Ayres, Harrison Birtwistle, Oliver Knussen and Anna Meredith, Repertoire opera productions included Rape of Lucretia, director David McVicar; The Rake’s Progress, director Neil Bartlett; Death in Venice, director Yoshi Oida. Other projects in Aldeburgh included SNAP – Art at the Aldeburgh Festival, with Abigail Lane, Ryan Gander, Maggi Hambling, Sarah Lucas, Glenn Brown and many others artists associated with Suffolk, and Faster than Sound, an experimental music programme including commissions from Mira Calix, Christian Marclay and Chris Watson amongst numerous others.
His tenure also saw considerable expansion of the artist development and education programme and major capital projects, with the creation of the Pumphouse in 2000, and in 2009, the new Hoffmann Building at Snape Maltings including the 350 seat Britten Studio.

Other roles

Reekie has been a trustee of Musica nel Chiostro, the Arts Foundation  and an adviser to the Paul Hamlyn Foundation.

Awards

In 2010 Reekie was made an Honorary Fellow, Royal Academy of Music, London and received an Honorary Doctorate of Music, University of East Anglia.

Reekie was appointed Commander of the British Empire CBE in the 2013 Birthday Honours for services to music.

References 

1964 births
Living people
Commanders of the Order of the British Empire